Anelis Assumpção (born 16 May 1980) is a Brazilian singer-songwriter.

Biography
Born in São Paulo, Anelis Assumpção is the daughter of Itamar Assumpção, one of the major figures of the Vanguarda Paulista; she began her career as a backing vocalist for her father, and in 2001 joined the group DonaZica. She started her solo career in 2007.

Céu and Thalma de Freitas returned to collaborate with Assumpção on her next two albums, which also feature guest appearances by João Donato, Tulipa Ruiz, Ava Rocha, Liniker, and Kiko Dinucci, among others. 

Her album Taurina won the 2018 Multishow SuperJury Awards for Best Record and Best Cover, and was named 14th best Brazilian album of the year by the magazine Rolling Stone Brazil.

Discography

Studio albums
with DonaZica 
     2003 - Composição
     2005 - Filme brasileiro

Solo albums
     2011 - Sou Suspeita, Estou Sujeita, não Sou Santa
     2014 - Anelis Assumpção e os Amigos Imaginários
     2018 - Taurina

References

External links 
 
 

1980 births
Living people
Musicians from São Paulo
Brazilian singer-songwriters 
Música Popular Brasileira singers
21st-century Brazilian singers
21st-century Brazilian women singers
Women in Latin music